In Mandaean cosmology, Siniawis is a region in the World of Darkness (alma ḏ-hšuka) or underworld. It is described as "the lower earth of the darkness" in Chapter 1 of Book 5 in the Right Ginza.

See also
Piriawis, its corresponding opposite in the World of Light

References

Mandaean cosmology
Conceptions of hell
Underworld